Elena Felipe and Bernadina Rivera are Purepecha Mexican potters from Huancito, Michoacán known for making towers of stacked storage containers. The two are native speakers of the indigenous language and are sisters-in-law, with Elena married to Bernadina’s brother.  Both learned pottery as children and are passing the tradition onto the next generation.

The pots are a kind of cantaro, or storage container for water, descendants from the colonial-era efforts of Vasco de Quiroga, who introduced new crafts and new craft techniques to the region. The towers were created as a way to store more water in less space.

They obtain their clay from communal lands, digging it up and doing all the processing by hand, even doing the grinding in a metate. The pots and other works are made with the use of molds. Before firing, they are dipped in a brown pigment made from soil, then burnished with a stone and cloth, then painted with fine details of images such as flowers, hummingbirds and butterflies.

The two have won awards for their work including those in the state of Michoacán, and the Premio Fomento Cultural Banamex.

References

Mexican artists
Mexican potters